Pietro Guarienti (c. 1700–1765) was an Italian painter and art-biographer of the late-Baroque period, active mainly in Bologna.

He was born in Verona, then traveled to Bologna and Venice. He became the  pupil of the painter Giuseppe Maria Crespi and Falcieri. In 1746, he became the godfather of Bernardo Bellotto’s daughter. Bellotto was to become court painter in Dresden in 1748. He was made director of the Dresden art gallery by Frederick Augustus III of Saxony, and is best known for the addenda, specially detailing the stories of the vedutisti he wrote to Pellegrino Antonio Orlandi’s Abecedario Pittorico, published in Venice in 1753.

References

1700s births
1765 deaths
Painters from Verona
18th-century Italian painters
Italian male painters
Italian art historians
18th-century Italian male artists